Hungry Dinosaurs is a strategy game for the Super Nintendo Entertainment System. It was developed and published by Magical Company on October 19, 1994 in Japan, and was later published by Sunsoft in Europe on January 3, 1995. The game was never released in North America in any form.

Gameplay 

The objective of the game is to place eggs by walking on a 9x9 playing field. The player can eat the eggs by pressing the B button. In order to win, the player must have more eggs than the others; failing to do so will cause the player to lose the game.

Reception 
The game received mixed to poor reviews. Total! gave the game a score of 75%, Mega Fun gave the game a score of 43%, and Video Games gave the game a score of 25%.

References

Notes 

1994 video games
1995 video games
Strategy video games
Dinosaurs in video games
Cooperative video games
Magical Company games
Sunsoft games
Multiplayer and single-player video games
Super Nintendo Entertainment System games
Super Nintendo Entertainment System-only games
Video games developed in Japan